Moradabad (also Romanized as Morādābād) is a village in Badr Rural District, in the Central District of Ravansar County, Kermanshah Province, Iran. At the 2006 census, its population was 242, in 54 families.

References 

Populated places in Ravansar County